Aimé-Romarin Billong (born June 11, 1970) is a Cameroonian former professional footballer who played as a defender. His brother Silas is also a former footballer.

Born in Moundou, Chad, Billong played for the Cameroon national team and a few clubs in France. In October 1999 he signed for Premier League side West Ham United to play under Harry Redknapp. However, he never made a first team appearance for the club.

He was a participant at the 1998 African Cup of Nations, playing in the group match against Burkina Faso and the quarterfinal against Congo DR. Billong also represented Cameroon during 1998 World Cup qualifiers, but he was not included in the 22-man squad for the final tournament in France.

References

External links
 
 
 Biography

Living people
1970 births
Association football defenders
Cameroonian footballers
Cameroon international footballers
1998 African Cup of Nations players
Ligue 1 players
Olympique Lyonnais players
AS Saint-Étienne players
West Ham United F.C. players
AS Nancy Lorraine players
Cameroonian expatriate footballers
Cameroonian expatriate sportspeople in France
Expatriate footballers in France
Cameroonian expatriate sportspeople in England
Expatriate footballers in England
ESCP Europe alumni